Harry Dave Ntimban-Zeh (born 26 September 1973) is a French former footballer who played as a defender.

He was signed by Wimbledon from S.C. Espinho in March 2004. He was released by Milton Keynes Dons in July 2005.

References

External links

1973 births
Living people
Footballers from Paris
French footballers
Association football defenders
Racing Club de France Football players
Wimbledon F.C. players
Milton Keynes Dons F.C. players
English Football League players